Kristen Ulmer (born September 8, 1966) is a former professional extreme skier who retired from the sport in 2003 to further study and teach about overcoming fear.

Early life and education
Born and raised in the small town of Henniker, New Hampshire, she moved to Salt Lake City, Utah in 1985 to attend the University of Utah. In 1986, she started competing in mogul skiing and filming extreme ski movies, which led to her embarking upon a professional ski career that lasted for almost two decades. Since retiring in 2003, she has been studying with Zen master Genpo Roshi, and credits him as being the inspiration behind her teaching style and work on the subject of fear.

Professional athletics
Ulmer was on the US Ski Team for moguls in 1991. She also starred in over 20 ski movies, and was named the best female big mountain extreme skier in the world from 1990 to 2001 by the ski media. In 1997, Ulmer was also voted in a Powder magazine ski industry survey as the best overall female skier in the world. She is known for jumping off up to 70-foot cliffs, throwing flips, and for ski mountaineering feats such as the first female ski descent of Wyoming's Grand Teton in 1997.

An avid rock and ice climber, paraglider pilot, adventure cyclist, and kiteboarder, Ulmer was voted by the outdoor industry in a 2000 Women's Sports and Fitness magazine poll as the most extreme woman athlete in North America. She eventually retired from professional athletics in 2003.

Later career
Alongside her ski career, Ulmer was known for writing in magazines such as Skiing, Ski, Powder, Maxim, Details, and Outside.

Ulmer coaches athletes in various sport disciplines and runs mindset-only ski camps called The Art of Fear ski camps, at Alta, Utah.

Ulmer's book The Art of Fear challenges existing norms about what to do about fear and offers an alternative approach to resolving anxiety issues.

Personal life
Divorced from aerospace engineer Kirk Jellum since 2021, she remains single today. She attends the Burning Man festival in Nevada each year and is known alongside her ex-husband for building and bringing the Praying Mantis and Scorpion art cars. The fire-breathing Praying Mantis can now be seen at the Container Park in Downtown Las Vegas.

References

External links

"The Princess of Extreme Skiing: That Girl", Powder Magazine
Forbes magazine interview on skiing the Grand Teton
Manage your Fear with guest Kristen Ulmer 11/6/2014  radio interview
On Fear as the Mind Killer
"New Years Destinations: Ski to Live", 1/28/13 Outside magazine
"Kristen Ulmer: From extreme skiing to mindset training", Lifesherpa podcast
"Mind Over Mountain?" Wall Street Journal full page article about Ski to Live. 3/19/12
"Mind Over Mountain: Former Extreme skier Kristen Ulmer shows students that whether they think they can or think they can't they're right".  Ski Magazine Oct 2010
"Ski to Live", Forbes magazine, 11/16/07

1966 births
Living people
American female alpine skiers
21st-century American women